SH, Sh, sH or sh may refer to:

Businesses and organizations 
 FlyMe (IATA airline designator), a defunct airline
 Sacred Heart Cathedral Preparatory, a school in San Francisco, California, USA
 Sonatrach, an Algerian oil company

Geography 
 Saint Helena Island ISO 3166 digram and FIPS PUB 10-4 territory code
 Canton of Schaffhausen, Switzerland
 Schleswig-Holstein, a state of Germany
 Shanghai, China (Guobiao abbreviation SH)
 Shortstown, England
 South Horizons
 State highway

Language 
 sh (digraph), a letter combination used in some languages
 Voiceless postalveolar fricative , the sound usually spelt sh in English
 sh (letter), a letter of the Albanian alphabet
 , deprecated ISO 639-1 code for the Serbo-Croatian language

Science, technology, and mathematics

Computing
 .sh, the country code top-level domain (ccTLD) of Saint Helena
 Lib Sh, a graphics metaprogramming library for C++
 Unix shell, a general command-line shell for Unix
 Bourne shell, a command-line shell for Unix
 Thompson shell, a command-line shell for Unix
 Sharp Corporation's mobile phones in Japan
 SuperH, a Hitachi microcontroller
 An interface type in the IP Multimedia Subsystem
 Sensor Hub

Other uses in science, technology, and mathematics
 -SH, representing the thiol functional group in a chemical structure diagram
 Hyperbolic sine (sh), a mathematical function
 Siberian High, in meteorology
 Sherwood number, in engineering
 Suslin hypothesis, in mathematical set theory

Other uses 
 Shinbi's House, an initial title for The Haunted House, a Tooniverse animated television series
 Sacrifice hit, in baseball scoring
 Self-harm
 Sheikh, an honorific title in the Arabic language
 Silent Hill, video game franchise of survival horror
 HS or SH Solar Hijri calendar, the modern Iranian calendar
 An abbreviation for shilling
 Sacred Heart University its initials

See also
 Sha (Cyrillic), the letter ш, transliterated into English script as "sh"